José Antonio de Lavalle y García (Lima,  – ) was a Peruvian agronomist and horse breeder. He was the inspiration for Chabuca Granda's song José Antonio.

Biography

He was born to aristocratic parents José Antonio de Lavalle y Pardo and Rosalía García Delgado. He was a descendant through his father's family of the counts of Premio Real and Casa Saavedra, both by his grandfather; and of the Marquises of Fuente Hermosa de Miranda, by his grandmother. He studied at the Colegio Sagrados Corazones Recoleta (1897–1903) and then entered the National School of Agriculture, from which he graduated as an agronomist (1909). In 1921, he married Sara Garragori Cebrián, with whom he had four children.

He held various positions in the agricultural and livestock industry: director of the cotton experimental station (1910–1911), general administrator of the Sociedad Ganadera del Centro (1913–1913), head of the Guano Administration Company (1914–1932).

He was a technical adviser to the Secretariat of the Presidency of the Republic, from 1940 to 1945, during the government of Manuel Prado Ugarteche.

A lover and preserver of the Peruvian Paso, he was a personal friend of Eduardo Granda and his daughter Chabuca, who wrote a criollo waltz named after him after Lavalle died in 1957.

He had been a member of the Society of Engineers, the Peruvian Association of Agricultural Engineers, the National Association of Writers and Artists, the National Club, the Jockey Club, and the Regatas Club.

Lavalle died in 1957.

Selected works
 La Industria ganadera en el departamento de Junín. (1911)
 De agronomía nacional. (1912)
 El mejoramiento de los pastos de la sierra del Perú. (1913)
 El guano y la agricultura nacional. (1914)
 Las necesidades de guano de la agricultura nacional.  (1917)
 La crisis económica mundial.  (1932)

Ancestry

References

1888 births
1957 deaths
Lavalle family
Pardo family
People from Lima
Peruvian agronomists
Recipients of the Order of the Sun of Peru